Mark Richard Davis (born 26 February 1962 in Kilve, Somerset) is a former professional cricketer, who represented Somerset County Cricket Club in 77 first-class matches and 59 List A matches between 1982 and 1987.  A left arm fast-medium bowler and left-handed batsmen, his ability was brought to the attention of Somerset after winning a competition in a local newspaper. Before making his full debut for Somerset he represented Wiltshire, a minor county side.  During his career he took 149 first-class wickets at an average of 35.62 and a best performance of 7 for 55. He averaged 14.60 with the bat with a solitary first-class fifty, 60 not out.

After retiring in 1989 he became a builder for a short period before training to become a cricket coach. In 1996 he joined Millfield School and has remained as the head coach there working alongside Richard Ellison. Recently he has joined the cricket commentary team on BBC Radio Bristol and works as the on-air analyst.

References

1962 births
Living people
Somerset cricketers
English cricketers
Wiltshire cricketers